Polygonum oxyspermum is a coastal species of flowering plant in the buckwheat family. It is native to Europe, primarily along the shores of the Atlantic, the North Sea, and the Baltic Sea, from France and Ireland to Finland and Russia. It is also naturalized in eastern Canada and in the US State of Maine.

Description
Polygonum oxyspermum is green or blue-green. Annual, stems prostrate, generally run along the surface of the ground but sometimes do rise above ground level. Flowers are green, white or pink, in axillary clusters.

Subspecies
Three subspecies are widely recognized, although some authors prefer to regard them as distinct species.
 Polygonum oxyspermum subsp. oxyspermum  – northern Europe; naturalized in Nova Scotia
 Polygonum oxyspermum subsp. raii (Bab.) D.A.Webb & Chater northern Europe; naturalized in Nova Scotia, Prince Edward Island, New Brunswick, Québec, Maine, Newfoundland
 Polygonum oxyspermum subsp. robertii (Loisel.) Akeroyd & D.A.Webb – Italy

References

External links
A Photo Flora, Polygonum oxyspermum – Ray's Knotgrass (Polygonaceae Images) photos
Flora of Northern Ireland

oxyspermum
Flora of Europe
Plants described in 1824